La'Mont Johnson, laMont Johnson, Lamont Johnson, or variation, may refer to:

 Lamont Johnson (1922-2010) U.S. filmmaker
 LaMont Johnson (1941-1999) U.S. jazz pianist
 Lamont Johnson (fretless bassist) (born 1955) U.S. musician

See also
 Johnson (disambiguation)
 Mont Johnson, former owner of the Springville, Utah, USA, structure Mont and Harriet Johnson House 
 Mount Johnson (disambiguation)